In mathematics, Euler's identity (also known as Euler's equation) is the equality

where
 is Euler's number, the base of natural logarithms,
 is the imaginary unit, which by definition satisfies , and
 is pi, the ratio of the circumference of a circle to its diameter.
Euler's identity is named after the Swiss mathematician Leonhard Euler. Euler's identity is considered to be an exemplar of mathematical beauty as it shows a profound connection between the most fundamental numbers in mathematics. In addition, it is directly used in a proof that  is transcendental, which implies the impossibility of squaring the circle.

Mathematical beauty
Euler's identity is often cited as an example of deep mathematical beauty. Three of the basic arithmetic operations occur exactly once each: addition, multiplication, and exponentiation. The identity also links five fundamental mathematical constants:
 The number 0, the additive identity.
 The number 1, the multiplicative identity.
 The number  ( = 3.1415...), the fundamental circle constant.
 The number  ( = 2.718...), also known as Euler's number, which occurs widely in mathematical analysis.
 The number , the imaginary unit of the complex numbers.

Furthermore, the equation is given in the form of an expression set equal to zero, which is common practice in several areas of mathematics.

Stanford University mathematics professor Keith Devlin has said, "like a Shakespearean sonnet that captures the very essence of love, or a painting that brings out the beauty of the human form that is far more than just skin deep, Euler's equation reaches down into the very depths of existence". And Paul Nahin, a professor emeritus at the University of New Hampshire, who has written a book dedicated to Euler's formula and its applications in Fourier analysis, describes Euler's identity as being "of exquisite beauty".

Mathematics writer Constance Reid has opined that Euler's identity is "the most famous formula in all mathematics". And Benjamin Peirce, a 19th-century American philosopher, mathematician, and professor at Harvard University, after proving Euler's identity during a lecture, stated that the identity "is absolutely paradoxical; we cannot understand it, and we don't know what it means, but we have proved it, and therefore we know it must be the truth".

A poll of readers conducted by The Mathematical Intelligencer in 1990 named Euler's identity as the "most beautiful theorem in mathematics". In another poll of readers that was conducted by Physics World in 2004, Euler's identity tied with Maxwell's equations (of electromagnetism) as the "greatest equation ever".

At least three books in popular mathematics have been published about Euler's identity:
Dr. Euler's Fabulous Formula: Cures Many Mathematical Ills, by Paul Nahin (2011)
A Most Elegant Equation: Euler's formula and the beauty of mathematics, by David Stipp (2017)
Euler's Pioneering Equation: The most beautiful theorem in mathematics, by Robin Wilson (2018).

Explanations

Imaginary exponents

Fundamentally, Euler's identity asserts that  is equal to −1. The expression  is a special case of the expression , where  is any complex number. In general,  is defined for complex  by extending one of the definitions of the exponential function from real exponents to complex exponents. For example, one common definition is:

This limit is illustrated in the animation to the right.

Euler's identity is a special case of Euler's formula, which states that for any real number ,

 

where the inputs of the trigonometric functions sine and cosine are given in radians.

In particular, when ,

 

Since

and

it follows that

 

which yields Euler's identity:

Geometric interpretation
Any complex number  can be represented by the point  on the complex plane. According to Euler's formula, this is equivalent to saying .

Euler's identity says that .

Since multiplication by −1 reflects a point across the origin, Euler's identity can be interpreted as saying that rotating any point  radians around the origin has the same effect as reflecting the point across the origin. Similarly, setting  equal to  yields the related equation  which can be interpreted as saying that rotating any point by one turn around the origin returns it to its original position.

Generalizations

Euler's identity is the case where .

In another field of mathematics, by using quaternion exponentiation, one can show that a similar identity also applies to quaternions. Let  be the basis elements; then,

For octonions, with real  such that , and with the octonion basis elements ,

History
While Euler's identity is a direct result of Euler's formula, published in his monumental work of mathematical analysis in 1748, Introductio in analysin infinitorum, it is questionable whether the particular concept of linking five fundamental constants in a compact form can be attributed to Euler himself, as he may never have expressed it.

Robin Wilson states the following.

See also 

De Moivre's formula 
Exponential function
Gelfond's constant

Notes

References

Sources
 Conway, John H., and Guy, Richard K. (1996), The Book of Numbers, Springer 
 Crease, Robert P. (10 May 2004), "The greatest equations ever", Physics World [registration required]
 Dunham, William (1999), Euler: The Master of Us All, Mathematical Association of America 
 Euler, Leonhard (1922), Leonhardi Euleri opera omnia. 1, Opera mathematica. Volumen VIII, Leonhardi Euleri introductio in analysin infinitorum. Tomus primus, Leipzig: B. G. Teubneri
 Kasner, E., and Newman, J. (1940), Mathematics and the Imagination, Simon & Schuster
 Maor, Eli (1998), : The Story of a number, Princeton University Press 
 Nahin, Paul J. (2006), Dr. Euler's Fabulous Formula: Cures Many Mathematical Ills, Princeton University Press 
 Paulos, John Allen (1992), Beyond Numeracy: An Uncommon Dictionary of Mathematics, Penguin Books 
 Reid, Constance (various editions), From Zero to Infinity, Mathematical Association of America
 Sandifer, C. Edward (2007), Euler's Greatest Hits, Mathematical Association of America

External links

 Intuitive understanding of Euler's formula

Exponentials
Mathematical identities
E (mathematical constant)
Theorems in complex analysis
Leonhard Euler

de:Eulersche Formel#Eulersche Identit.C3.A4t
pl:Wzór Eulera#Tożsamość Eulera